Bouzeron is a commune in the Saône-et-Loire department in Bourgogne-Franche-Comté in eastern France.

Geography  
Bouzeron is a wine-growing village located near Chagny.

Wine 

Bouzeron is also an appellation d'origine contrôlée in the Cote Chalonnaise sub-region of Burgundy for a white wine made exclusively from the Aligoté grape, created in 1998. It is the only communal appellation for Aligoté wine, the rest of them being sold under the regional appellation Bourgogne Aligoté AOC. Pinot noir and Chardonnay wines are also produced in the commune, but sold under the appellations Bourgogne rouge or blanc or Bourgogne Côte Chalonnaise.

See also
Communes of the Saône-et-Loire department

References

Communes of Saône-et-Loire
Saône-et-Loire communes articles needing translation from French Wikipedia